Onset of Putrefaction is the debut album by German technical death metal band Necrophagist. It was recorded almost solely by the band's founder, guitarist and vocalist Muhammed Suiçmez, who recorded all the vocal tracks and programmed most of the drum, bass and guitar tracks with some help from Jochen Bittmann and  Bjoern Vollmer.

Background

Release and 2004 re-release
The original 1999 version of the album was very difficult to obtain due to distribution problems with French label Noise Solution Records who owned the rights to its music and pressed only 1,000 copies. American label Willowtip Records' founder Jason Tipton described the situation in an interview:

Despite the hardships of the situation, Willowtip eventually successfully re-released  Onset of Putrefaction. The re-release version of the album features new cover art as well as a complete remaster of all its songs as well as new resampled drum machine tracks. The vastly improved drum samples used by the drum machine were recorded and programmed by drummer Hannes Grossmann.

Track listing
All songs written by Muhammed Suiçmez.

2004 re-issue bonus tracks

Reception

Personnel
Necrophagist
 Muhammed Suiçmez – vocals, guitars, bass guitar, drum programming 
 Jochen Bittmann – additional bass guitar
 Bjoern Vollmer – guitar solo on "Extreme Unction"
 Hannes Grossmann - additional drum programming (2004 re-release)
Production 
 Muhammed Suiçmez – producer

References

Necrophagist albums
1999 debut albums